Furuyama is a Japanese surname. Notable people with the surname include:

, Japanese discus thrower
, 18th-century Japanese ukiyo-e painter
, Japanese equestrian

See also
16759 Furuyama, a main-belt asteroid

Japanese-language surnames